The Meeting for friendship among peoples (Meeting per l'amicizia fra i popoli in Italian) is a multi-event Catholic festival held every year in Rimini, Italy, in a week at the end of August. The first edition took place in 1980.

Description 
The meeting is organized, since 2008, by the Foundation Meeting for Friendship amongst Peoples.

Apart from seven people who work full-time for its planning, the festival is entirely staged, managed and dismantled by about 4,000 volunteers (mostly university students) coming from all over Italy and ten other countries of the world.
The meeting has had about 800,000 attendees per year in the last editions. Several prominent people from science, culture, society and politics give lectures at the meeting, including Nobel prize recipients, religious authorities (the Pope participated in 1982), politicians and ministers (the Italian prime minister participated a few times), international authorities (Tony Blair and others), writers, musicians (Riccardo Muti participated).

After the meeting in Rimini, other similar events have been organized: among these, the New York Encounter, an event held in New York in January every year and the Cairo Meeting, held in Cairo (Egypt).

Brief history of the Meeting 
Every year the meeting has an overriding theme, to which every event is intended to relate
 1980 Peace and human rights (23–31 August 1980).
 1981 The Europe of peoples and cultures (22–29 August 1981).
 1982 The resources of man (21–29 August 1982).
 1983 Men monkeys robots (21–28 August 1983).
 1984 America Americas, 1984: The impossible tolerance? (25 August - 1 September 1984).
 1985 The beast, Percival & Superman (24–31 August 1985).
 1986 Drums, bits, messages (23–30 August 1986).
 1987 Creation, art, economy (22–29 August 1987).
 1988 Seekers of the infinite, builders of history (20–27 August 1988).
 1989 Socrates, Sherlock Holmes, Don Juan. Approach, investigation and possession of reality: in paradox (20–27 August 1989).
 1990 The admirer, Einstein, Thomas Becket (25 August - 1 September 1990).
 1991 Antigone is back and the old immigrant, amid those in power and new badges (24–31 August 1991).
 1992 The yellow, the black, the amerindian and the Latin search of Americas (22–29 August 1992).
 1993 Something is happening from the east (21–28 August 1993).
 1994 And the exiled people continued on its journey (21–27 August 1994).
 1995 A thousand years are like a spell of guard duty in the night (20–26 August 1995).
 1996 A raging wind blew up from the east and, confident in their guide, they navigated to the ends of the earth (18–24 August 1996).
 1997 The Starets replied: "Truly, all is good and splendid because all is truth" (24–30 August 1997).
 1998 Life is not a dream (23–29 August 1998).
 1999 The unknown generates fear, Mystery fills with wonder (22–28 August 1999).
 2000 2000 years, a never-ending ideal (20–26 August 2000).
 2001 All of life asks for eternity (19–25 August 2001).
 2002 The feeling of things, the contemplation of beauty (18–24 August 2002).
 2003 Is there a man who longs for life and desires happy days? (24–30 August 2003).
 2004 Our progress does not consist in presuming we have reached our goal, but in continuously striving to achieve it (22–28 August 2004).
 2005 Freedom is the most precious gift that heaven has bestowed upon men (21–27 August 2005).
 2006 Reason is the need for infinite and culminates in the sigh and the presentiment that this infinite be manifested (20–26 August 2006).
 2007 Truth is the destiny for which we have been made (19–25 August 2007)
 2008 Either protagonists or nobodies (24–30 August 2008)
 2009 Knowledge is always an event (23–29 August 2009)
 2010 That Nature Which Causes Us to Desire Great Things is the Heart (22–28 August 2010)
 2011 And Existence Becomes an Immense Certainty (21–27 August 2011)
 2012 By nature, man is relation to the infinite (19–25 August 2012)
 2013 The human person: a state of emergency (18–24 August 2013)
 2014 To the ends of the earth and of existence. Destiny has not left man alone. (24–30 August 2014)
 2015 What is this lack a lack of, oh heart, of which all of a sudden you are full? (20–26 August 2015)

References

External links
 Official site of Meeting for friendship among peoples

Festivals in Italy
Communion and Liberation